Monumento may refer to:

 Monumento (album), a 2008 album by Dakrya
 Monumento, a district in Caloocan, Philippines where the Bonifacio Monument is located
 Monumento LRT station, Manila LRT station serving the said area

See also 
Monumento means monument in Portuguese, Spanish, and Filipino.  For relevant articles in Wikipedia see:
 Monuments of Portugal
 Monument (Spain)